Tim Andre Barnett (born April 19, 1968 in Gunnison, Mississippi) is a former professional American football wide receiver who played three seasons for the Kansas City Chiefs in the National Football League.

College Statistics 
 1989: 9 TD
 1990: 731 yards with 8 TD

Legal Issues 

Barnett was convicted of second-degree sexual assault after allegedly exposing himself to a 14-year-old hotel maid in Milwaukee, Wisconsin on June 14, 1994.  He was sentenced to three years in prison. Barnett was released from the Chiefs after being charged, ending his NFL career.

References

External links 
NFL.com player page
encyclopedia.com article
Chicago Tribune article

1968 births
Living people
People from Bolivar County, Mississippi
American football wide receivers
Jackson State Tigers football players
Kansas City Chiefs players